Angel Moraes (August 7, 1965 – February 27, 2021) was an electronic music DJ from Brooklyn, New York.

Career
He began his career in the 1980s and was the DJ at NYC nightclubs including Paradise Garage, and formed the record label Hot 'N' Spycy in 1993. One of his own first releases on the label was "Release Yourself". In 1995 his single "Heaven Knows" reached number 25 on Billboard's Dance charts, and in 1996 his track "Burnin' Up" reached number 41 on the same chart. In 1996 his label began a distribution deal with UK label Subversion Records. Over his career he co-created music with other electronica musicians, including Junior Vasquez. As a remixer, he worked with musicians including Pet Shop Boys, k.d. lang, Roy Davis Jr., Jaydee, and Funky Green Dogs.

Stereo nightclub

In 1998, Moraes became the founder of Stereo nightclub in Montreal, and released the live album Back From Stereo in 2000. He sold the nightclub to friends in 2003, but returned to the club in 2009 as a sound engineer and DJ.

Death
Moraes died on February 27, 2021, at the age of 55.

References

1965 births
2021 deaths
DJs from New York City
American company founders
Musicians from Brooklyn
American electronic musicians
Record producers from New York (state)
20th-century American musicians
21st-century American musicians